Santiago Gastón Tallarico (born 23 March 1997) is an Argentine professional footballer who plays as a defender for Colegiales.

Career
Tallarico appeared in the youth system of Boca Juniors. In 2018, Tallarico moved to Uruguayan Segunda División side Sud América. His senior debut arrived on 24 March during a home defeat to Juventud, which preceded a further start later that month against Central Español. In the third of his five appearances in Uruguay, the defender was sent off in a fixture with Rentistas on 6 May. On 13 July 2018, Tallarico returned to Argentina with Colegiales of Primera B Metropolitana.

Career statistics
.

References

External links

1997 births
Living people
Place of birth missing (living people)
Argentine footballers
Association football defenders
Argentine expatriate footballers
Expatriate footballers in Uruguay
Argentine expatriate sportspeople in Uruguay
Uruguayan Segunda División players
Primera B Metropolitana players
Sud América players
Club Atlético Colegiales (Argentina) players